Ismail Rabee Juma (born 11 January 1983) is an Emirati footballer who currently plays as a goalkeeper , who played at 2007 AFC Asian Cup.

References

1983 births
Living people
Emirati footballers
United Arab Emirates international footballers
UAE First Division League players
UAE Pro League players
Al Shabab Al Arabi Club Dubai players
Al-Nasr SC (Dubai) players
Al Ain FC players
Al-Wasl F.C. players
Al-Shaab CSC players
Emirates Club players
Al-Taawon (UAE) Club players
Association football goalkeepers
2007 AFC Asian Cup players